Yorkshire international football team represents Yorkshire as a region in international association football. The team are affiliated with CONIFA (since 6 January 2018) and WUFA, it does not play in FIFA and UEFA matches.

It plays at various venues throughout the region. Founded in 2017, it is controlled by the Yorkshire International Football Association (YIFA). The first CONIFA match, a 1–1 draw with Ellan Vannin, took place on 28 January 2018 at the Yorkshire NuBuilds Stadium in Fitzwilliam.

History

Early attempts at a Yorkshire team
Despite Yorkshire having a representative schoolboy team for many years, there was no formal senior equivalent until 1924 when the West Riding County Football Association put together a men’s side as part of the jubilee of the University of Leeds. Players were chosen from Bradford City, Bradford Park Avenue, Halifax Town, Huddersfield Town and Leeds United. Although the team won 2–0, it did not represent the whole county. In 1935, a Yorkshire team made up of players from leading clubs across the entire region, including Bradford City, Huddersfield Town, Leeds United and Sheffield United, took on a team formed of Middlesbrough, Newcastle United and Sunderland players at the latter’s Roker Park ground as part of the Queen's jubilee celebrations. Once again, however, the team, which beat the North East side 3–2, was reported as representing only West Yorkshire.

First official Yorkshire international team
Officially established on 16 July 2017, YIFA held a foundation meeting in October of the same year at the Square Chapel, Halifax, to sign off its constitution and formalise its existence as a footballing body. While organising a senior Yorkshire international football team was its primary focus, YIFA also gave notice of its intention to seek membership of CONIFA. Plans for a senior women’s team and disability teams were also announced.

On 13 November 2017, YIFA announced that Ryan Farrell, assisted by Micky Long, had been appointed as Yorkshire's first ever head coach. On 6 January 2018, ahead of the friendly against Ellan Vannin, Yorkshire was accepted as a member of CONIFA. The following week, Matt Bradley of Dinnington Town was the first player revealed to have been called up to the national side, while Paddy McGuire, who plays for Thackley, was named the first captain.

Team colours
Yorkshire’s traditional kit colour is dark blue. The current kit is provided by Yorkshire-based sportswear company, Godzown Sports.

Logo
Inspired by the Yorkshire flag, the motif of the Yorkshire international football team features a stylised White Rose of York on a blue shield.

Fixtures and results

2018

2019

2021

Selected international opponents

Players
The following players were called up to the squad for the friendly against  on 10 October 2019.

Caps and goals correct as of 1 June 2019 after the game against  Parishes of Jersey.

Recent call-ups
The following players have been called up in the past twelve months or withdrew from the squad due to injury or suspension.

Head coach

See also

 :Category:Footballers from Yorkshire
 Football in England
 English football league system
 Football records in England

References

External links
Yorkshire International Football Association

CONIFA member associations
European national and official selection-teams not affiliated to FIFA
Football in Yorkshire
Football teams in England